Assoc. Prof. Dr. Mohd Nor bin Monutty (Jawi: محمد نور بن مونوتتي) is a Malaysian politician. He is a member of People's Justice Party (PKR), a component party of Pakatan Harapan (PH) coalition. He was appointed a Senator representing Selangor in the Dewan Negara for one term from 17 December 2015 to 16 December 2018.

He was the president of the Muslim Youth Movement of Malaysia or Angkatan Belia Islam Malaysia (ABIM) from 1991 to 1997.

Election results

References

Living people
1949 births
People from Perak
Malaysian people of Malay descent
Malaysian Muslims
Malaysian academics
People's Justice Party (Malaysia) politicians
United Malays National Organisation politicians
Members of the Dewan Negara
21st-century Malaysian politicians